The Howland H-3 Pegasus is an American ultralight aircraft that was designed by Bert Howland and made available by Howland Aero Design in the form of plans for amateur construction, with kits provided by Aircraft Spruce & Specialty Co. The H-3 first flew in 1988.

Design and development
If equipped with heavier engines it falls into the Experimental - Amateur-built category in its home country, although still qualifies as an ultralight in other countries, such as Canada. The H-3 features a cantilever low-wing, a single-seat, open cockpit, conventional landing gear and a single engine in tractor configuration.

The aircraft is made from wood and aluminium and covered in doped aircraft fabric covering. The fuselage is made from square aluminum tubing that is TIG welded and weighs  when completed. Its  span wing is of a straight planform. The landing gear is conventional, with suspended main wheels and a steerable tailwheel. The cockpit is of an open design, with a small windshield. Controls are conventional three-axis, with ailerons, rudder and elevator.

Since the death of the designer plans have been intermittently available and were last provided by Classic Aero Enterprises. Aircraft Spruce and Specialty continue to provide  raw materials kits.

The use of the  Rotax 277, or the similar weight and power Hirth F-33, allows the aircraft to fit into the US ultralight category if weight is carefully controlled during construction. However the H-3 is underpowered with this engine and most have been equipped with heavier engines of higher output, such as the  Rotax 447 or the  Rotax 503. The  Hirth F-263 and  Hirth 2704 have also been used.

Operational history
The H-3 won The Most Innovative Ultralight at Sun 'n Fun in 1989 and Best Commercial Ultralight at Sun 'n Fun 1990.

Specifications (H-3)

References

External links
 Photo of an H-3 in flight

1980s United States ultralight aircraft
Homebuilt aircraft
Single-engined tractor aircraft